Upahl is a municipality in the Nordwestmecklenburg district, in Mecklenburg-Vorpommern, Germany. The former municipality Plüschow was merged into Upahl in January 2019.

References

Nordwestmecklenburg